The Symphony No. 82 in C major, Hoboken 1/82, is the first of the six Paris Symphonies (numbers 82-87) written by Joseph Haydn. It is popularly known as the Bear Symphony.

Background

The symphony was one of a series of six symphonies commissioned in 1786 by the Concert de la Loge Olympique, a popular concert subscription in Paris (hence the name for the series as a whole). Like the other Paris symphonies, "the Bear" was written for the largest orchestral ensemble that Haydn had written for up until that time, including reinforced woodwind parts and a large string section. Despite its number, the symphony was actually the last of the six Paris symphonies to be composed. It was completed in 1786.

It was first performed in 1787 in Paris by the Concert de la Loge Olympique, directed by the celebrated musician, Joseph Bologne, Chevalier de Saint-Georges.

Movements

The work is in standard four movement form and scored for flute, two oboes, two bassoons, horns and/or trumpets, timpani, continuo (harpsichord) and strings. Early conflicting manuscript sources make the exact scoring for the brass unclear. Typically, however it is performed with both horns and trumpets.

Vivace assai, 
Allegretto,  in double variation form.
Menuet e Trio, 
Finale: Vivace,

Nickname (The Bear)
The symphony has long been popularly referred to as "the Bear". As with the nicknames of all Haydn's symphonies, it did not originate with the composer. Instead, the name derives from a recurring feature from the last movement (including its famous opening), in which Haydn imitates the tonality of bagpipes or Dudelsack: a low sustained drone, accentuated by a grace-note on the downbeat. This curious tonality prompted an 1829 piano arrangement of the symphony to be entitled "Danse de l'Ours," the earliest known printed appearance of the nickname. This is a reference to the music used to accompany dancing bears — a popular form of street entertainment.

See also
List of symphonies by name

Notes

References
Bernard Harrison, Haydn: The "Paris" Symphonies (Cambridge University Press, 1998)
H.C. Robbins Landon, The Symphonies of Joseph Haydn (Universal Edition and Rockliff, 1955)
DP Schroeder, Haydn and the Enlightenment: the late symphonies and their audience (Oxford University Press, 1997)

External links 
 

Symphony 082
Compositions in C major
1786 compositions